Two human polls make up the 2007–08 NCAA Division I women's basketball rankings, the AP Poll and the Coaches Poll, in addition to various publications' preseason polls.  As the 2007-08 basketball season progresses, rankings are updated weekly.

AP poll
The Associated Press (AP) preseason poll was released on October 29, 2007.  This poll is compiled by sportswriters across the nation.  In Division I men's and women's college basketball, the AP Poll is largely just a tool to compare schools throughout the season and spark debate, as it has no bearing on postseason play. Generally, all top 25 teams in the poll are invited to the  NCAA basketball tournament, also known as March Madness.

ESPN/USA Today Coaches Poll
The Coaches Poll is the second oldest poll still in use after the AP Poll. It is compiled by a rotating group of 31 college  Division I head coaches. The Poll operates by Borda count. Each voting member ranks teams from 1 to 25. Each team then receives points for their ranking in reverse order: Number 1 earns 25 points, number 2 earns 24 points, and so forth. The points are then combined and the team with the highest points is then ranked #1; second highest is ranked #2 and so forth. Only the top 25 teams with points are ranked, with teams receiving first place votes noted the quantity next to their name. Any team receiving votes after the top 25 are listed after the top 25 by their point totals. However, these are not real rankings: They are not considered #26, #27, etc. The maximum points a single team can earn is 775. The preseason poll was released on 2007-10-29.

Legend

References

College women's basketball rankings in the United States